Sarab-e Maleki (also Romanized as Sarāb-e Malekī, Sarāb-e Melkī, Sarv-e Malekī, and Sarvmaliki) is a village in Beyranvand-e Shomali Rural District, Bayravand District, Khorramabad County, Lorestan Province, Iran. At the 2006 census, its population was 111, in 23 families.

References 

Towns and villages in Khorramabad County